"Linear genetic programming" is unrelated to "linear programming".

Linear genetic programming (LGP) is a particular subset of genetic programming wherein computer programs in a population are represented as a sequence of instructions from imperative programming language or machine language. The graph-based data flow that results from a multiple usage of register contents and the existence of structurally noneffective code (introns) are two main differences of this genetic representation from the more common tree-based genetic programming (TGP) variant.

In genetic programming (GP) a linear tree is a program composed of a variable number of unary functions and a single terminal. Note that linear tree GP differs from bit string genetic algorithms since a population may contain programs of different lengths and there may be more than two types of functions or more than two types of terminals.

Examples of LGP programs

Because LGP programs are basically represented by a linear sequence of instructions, they are simpler to read and to operate on than their tree-based counterparts. For example, a simple program written in the LGP language Slash/A looks like a series of instructions separated by a slash:
input/   # gets an input from user and saves it to register F
0/       # sets register I = 0
save/    # saves content of F into data vector D[I] (i.e. D[0] := F)
input/   # gets another input, saves to F
add/     # adds to F current data pointed to by I (i.e. F := F + D[0])
output/. # outputs result from F
By representing such code in bytecode format, i.e. as an array of bytes each representing a different instruction, one can make mutation operations simply by changing an element of such an array.

See also 
 Multi expression programming
 Cartesian genetic programming
 Grammatical evolution
 Genetic programming

Notes

External links
Slash/A A programming language and C++ library specifically designed for linear GP
DigitalBiology.NET Vertical search engine for GA/GP resources
Discipulus Genetic-Programming Software
MicroGP Genetic-Programming Software (open source)

Genetic programming